Ibn-e-Hawwa is a Pakistani television drama series produced by Momina Duraid under banner MD Productions, written by Saji Gul and directed by Syed Ahmed Kamran. It stars Hira Mani, Shahzad Sheikh and Aymen Saleem. It broadcasts weekly on Hum TV from 8 February to 20 August 2022. 

Ibn-e-Hawwa is a portrayal of how men are taught to hate women. Further, the writer states that being called 'Ibn-e-Adam', men are made to associate themselves with a male figure. Hawa's name often gets overshadowed.

Plot 

Ibn-e-Hawwa revolves around a typical Pakistani mohalla (neighbourhood) where misogyny is deeply rooted. The story starts with Mahjabeen, a young pious widow who arranges all the arrangements for the marriage of her deceased husband's relatives. She done all the arrangements with the help of Shabratan, an older cunning lady of the mohalla who lives with her joyful and free-spirited daughter, Aliya. Aliya falls for Zahid, a cruel and cold hearted man, tailor by profession and who doesn’t know how to respect women as his mother has left him with his sister and father. His father have always realized him that his mother has betrayed him, so he becomes afraid of women and labelled them as unfaithful in his mind. After his father's death, Naseem (his mother) returns in his life as she wants to meet her children.

Mahjabeen who doest not know much about Zahid then does contract marriage with him. Naseem at first hates her and says she married him because she’s a woman of bad character but then apologizes for judging her too quickly.

Cast 

 Shehzad Sheikh as Zahid, a cold blooded man who has no respect for women
 Hira Mani as Mahjabeen, a young pious widow who wants to marry to perform hajj
 Aymen Saleem as Aliya, a free spirited lively girl who loves Zahid
 Nadia Afgan as Shabratan, Aliya's manipulating and opportunistic mother and Mahjabeen's friend
 Noman Habib as Guddu, Mahjabeen's nephew
 Hina Shahid/ Hareem Sohail as Naila, Zahid's sister who becomes victim of his cruel behaviour
 Agha Talal as Shakoor, worker in Zahid's shop who loves Naila
 Tahira Imam as Zahid's aunt
 Zain Afzal as Waqar "Vicky"
 Inaya Khan as Sajida, Aliya's friend
 Malik Raza as Raza, Zahid and Naila's father 
 Sabahat Adil Khan as Naseem, Zahid & Naila's mother
 Asad Mumtaz Malik as Sethi, Mahjabeen's Husband

Production 
The project was first announced by Saleem through his Instagram account.

The series is written by Saji Gul who previously write for O Rangreza and directed by Syed Ahmed Kamran who previously directed crime thriller Phaans.

In conversation with Dawn Images, Gul said that the drama's theme tackles the issue of misogyny. "It will be about how the mind of a man is moulded within a patriarchal system, how he is taught that a woman is inherently evil, how the man starts seeing all relationships in a negative light and as a burden, how he sees a woman as a deceiver," he said.

Speaking about the series' title he said, "Normally the terms Ibn-e-Adam (son of Adam) or Bint e Hawwa (daughter of Eve) are used. However, [we tend to forget] the son of Adam is also the son of Eve, he doesn't just descend from Adam alone."

The initial teasers were released on 21 January 2022.

Soundtrack

Reception 

While reviewing initial episodes, a reviewer from The News praised the storyline of the series and lauded the Saleem's performance as Aaliya and called it, "a breath of fresh air".

The serial started with a TRP of 7.8.

References 

2022 Pakistani television series debuts
Hum TV original programming
Pakistani romantic drama television series